Skvorin is a rural locality (a khutor) in Kachalinskoye Rural Settlement, Surovikinsky District, Volgograd Oblast, Russia. The population was 97 as of 2010. There are 3 streets.

Geography 
Skvorin is located 47 km northeast of Surovikino (the district's administrative centre) by road. Kachalin is the nearest rural locality.

References 

Rural localities in Surovikinsky District